The 2010–11 Australian region cyclone season was a near average tropical cyclone season, with eleven tropical cyclones forming compared to an average of 12. The season was also the costliest recorded in the Australian region basin, with a total of $3.62 billion (2011 USD) in damages, mostly from the destructive Cyclone Yasi. The season began on 1 November 2010 and ended on 30 April 2011, although the first tropical cyclone formed on 28 October. The Australian region is defined as being to the south of the equator, between the 90th meridian east and 160th meridian east. Tropical cyclones in this area are monitored by five Tropical Cyclone Warning Centres (TCWC's): Jakarta, Port Moresby, Perth, Darwin, and Brisbane, each of which have the power to name a tropical cyclone. The TCWC's in Perth, Darwin, and Brisbane are run by the Bureau of Meteorology, who designate significant tropical lows with a number and the U suffix. The Joint Typhoon Warning Center also issues unofficial warnings for the region, designating significant tropical cyclones with the "S" suffix when they form west of 135°E, and the "P" suffix when they form east of 135°E.


Seasonal forecasts 

Ahead of the cyclone season, the Australian Bureau of Meteorology (BoM), the New Zealand National Institute of Water and Atmospheric Research (NIWA) and various other Pacific Meteorological services, all contributed towards the Island Climate Update tropical cyclone outlook that was released during October 2010. The outlook took into account the moderate-strong La Niña conditions that had been observed across the Pacific and analogue seasons that had La Niña conditions occurring during the season. The outlook called for a normal or above average number of tropical cyclone occurring during the season, with nine to twelve named tropical cyclones, to occur between 135°E and 120°W compared to an average of nine. At least three of the tropical cyclones were expected to become category 3 severe tropical cyclones, while one was expected to become a category 4 severe tropical cyclone. In addition to contributing towards the Island Climate Update outlook, the BoM issued seven seasonal forecasts during October 2010, for the Australian region and the Southern Pacific with each forecast covering the whole tropical cyclone year. Each forecast issued took into account the La Niña conditions that had developed over the region and were forecasted to persist during the season.

For the Australian region as a whole it was predicted that the season could be the most active season since 1983–84 and that between 20 – 22 tropical cyclones would either develop within or move into the basin compared to an average of 12 cyclones. For the Western region between 90°E and 125°E, the BoM forecast that the area would see between 11 and 12 tropical cyclones compared to the average of 7, it was also noted that the region had a 93% chance of an above average cyclone season. For the North-Western subregion between 105°E and 130°E, it was predicted that activity would be above average, with 5 tropical cyclones and a 67% chance of above average tropical cyclone activity. TCWC Perth also noted that there was a likelihood of two tropical cyclones and a significant likelihood of at least one severe tropical cyclone impacting Western Australia. It was also noted that there was an increased chance of an early season cyclone and a system impacting Western Australia before Christmas 2010. It was predicted that the Northern Territory between 125°E and 142.5°E had a 75% chance of an above average season, and that the first cyclone of the season over the Territory and the monsoon onset would be expected to be earlier than normal. The Eastern region between 142.5°E and 160°E had an 87% chance of an above average season, with 7–8 tropical cyclones predicted for the region compared to an average of 6. The BoM also issued forecasts for the Western Southern Pacific region, between 142.5°E and 165°E and the Eastern Southern Pacific region between 165°E and 120°W. It was predicted that the Western Southern Pacific would have a 79% chance of having an above average season with 7–8 tropical cyclones occurring within the region, compared to an average of 5 tropical cyclones. The Eastern Southern Pacific region was predicted to have a 33% chance of having an above average season and 5–6 tropical cyclones compared to an average of 7 tropical cyclones.

The Guy Carpenter Asia-Pacific Climate Impact Centre (GCACIC) at the City University of Hong Kong and the Tropical Storm Risk Consortium (TSR) at the University College London also issued seasonal forecasts for the region.

Seasonal summary 

During the middle of October, the Madden-Julian Oscillation (MJO) moved through the eastern Indian Ocean and left an area of enhanced atmospheric convection in its wake. This subsequently combined with an equatorial Rossby wave, which contributed to the formation of Tropical Low 01U to the southwest of Sumatra, Indonesia on 28 October 2010. Over the next couple of days, the system moved westwards before it recurved south-eastwards during October 30.

Systems

Tropical Low Anggrek 

Tropical Low 01U was first noted by the BoM and BMKG during 28 October, while it was located to the southwest of Sumatra, Indonesia. Over the next day, the system moved slowly westwards, as atmospheric convection started to wrap into its consolidating low-level circulation centre, in an area of light to moderate vertical wind shear. The JTWC subsequently issued a tropical cyclone formation alert on the system during the following day, as the system turned southwards and interacted with a mid-level trough of low pressure.

On 30 October, the JTWC began issuing advisories on the system, designating it as Tropical Cyclone 02S. The next day, TCWC Jakarta reported that the low had intensified into a category 1 tropical cyclone on the Australian scale, naming it "Anggrek". Later that day, as the system moved towards the southeast, it entered the BoM's area of responsibility as it further intensified into a category 2 tropical cyclone. Anggrek passed to the east of the Cocos (Keeling) Islands early on 2 November, with the system beginning a weakening trend soon afterwards. On 4 November, TCWC Perth issued the final advisory on the system as Anggrek weakened into a tropical low. The next day, the remnants of Anggrek entered the south-west Indian Ocean as a convective-less circulation center.

Throughout the Cocos (Keeling) Islands, heavy rain and gusty winds were experienced as Cyclone Anggrek passed. Only minor damage was reported, with several trees and power lines brought down. No deaths were reported across the islands. In post-storm analysis, TCWC Perth declassified Anggrek as a tropical cyclone as gale-force winds never extended more than halfway around the system center.

Tropical Cyclone Abele 

Over the next day Abele weakened further because of cooler sea surface temperatures and increasing vertical wind shear, before it was last noted by both the BoM and JTWC during 5 December.

Tropical Low 03U 

On 15 December a monsoonal low developed about 500 km north-west of Exmouth, Western Australia. The system drifted slowly to the south-east. Gales and heavy rain reached areas far from the centre of the system which crossed the coast near Coral Bay on 18 December. However, shortly after landfall the system turned sharply to the south-west and reached the Indian Ocean west of Carnarvon on 19 December. It moved away from the coast and dissipated late on 20 December some 500 km west of Geraldton.

In the catchment basin of the Gascoyne River heavy precipitation fell from 16 to 19 December and triggered one of the worst floods along the Gascoyne River in history. The rain also affected other river basins in the area, such as Wooramel, Murchison, Lyndon-Minilya, and Ashburton rivers. For the period from 16 to 20 December some stations reported up to 300 mm cumulated precipitation which is equivalent to the normal annual rainfall amount. The highest 24 hours rainfall was reported at Carnarvon Airport on 17 December. During that day 207.8 mm fell which set an all-time record since recording began in 1883 with the previous record 119.4 mm set on 24 March 1923.

Preliminary estimates placed damage at A$100 million (US$100.4 million) with at least 2000 head of cattle lost in the flood.

Tropical Cyclone Tasha 

In late December, a low-pressure area was tracked for several days moving westwards towards Queensland. The cyclone crossed the coast between Cairns and Innisfail at about 5:30 am, with wind gusts of up to  recorded off the coast. Rainfall of about 100 mm was recorded in the space of an hour. Damage from associated flooding was estimated at A$1 billion.

Tropical Cyclone Vince 

At midnight on 10 January, the Bureau of Meteorology (BoM) reported that a Tropical Low had developed off the coast of Western Australia. The system gradually intensified and became a Category 1 tropical cyclone on 12 January, receiving the name "Vince". The cyclone was initially expected to reach Category 2 status, but it became less well organised and lost cyclone intensity on 14 January.

Severe Tropical Cyclone Zelia 

On 12 January, TCWC Brisbane started monitoring Tropical Low 10U that had developed, over the Coral Sea to the northeast of Townsville in Queensland, Australia.

Tropical Cyclone Anthony 

During 22 January TCWC Brisbane reported that Tropical Low 11U had developed within the northwestern Coral Sea to the northeast of Cairns, Australia. Over the next day atmospheric convection developed and organised over the systems low level circulation, as it moved southeastwards away from the Queensland Coast under the influence of an upper-level trough of low pressure. The JTWC subsequently initiated advisories on the system early on 23 January and designated it as Tropical Cyclone 09P, before TCWC Brisbane reported that the system had developed into a category 1 tropical cyclone and named it Anthony. During that day the system may have become a category 2 tropical cyclone as radar and microwave imagery showed that Anthony had a well defined circulation and was forming a partial eyewall. The system subsequently moved into an area of higher vertical windshear and weakened into a tropical low during 24 January as it moved into the South Pacific basin.

The system moved back into the Australian region during 25 January but remained a tropical low over the next few days, as it moved north-westwards across the Coral Sea as a low level circulation centre with little or no associated convection. During 28 January TCWC Brisbane briefly reported that Anthony had re-intensified into a category 1 tropical cyclone, after wind shear over the system reduced due to a possible Fujiwhara interaction with a secondary circulation to the east of Anthony and Severe Tropical Cyclone Wilma. However, later that day the system turned and started moving towards the north-west as the secondary system moved to its north, which meant that Anthony became sheared again and weakened into a tropical low. The system remained a sheared tropical low until late on 29 January, when convection began to increase and organize as a result of weakening upper atmospheric wind shear. The system subsequently made landfall on the Queensland east coast near Bowen and rapidly weakened over land.

Ahead of Anthony's landfall on the Queensland east coast, tropical cyclone watches and warnings were issued for the region between Innisfail, St Lawrence and Charters Towers. Townsville and Mackay were pre-emptively declared disaster areas to aid the recovery response, while the ports of Townsville, Mackay, Hay Point and Abbott Point were closed.

Severe Tropical Cyclone Bianca 

Early on 21 January TCWC Darwin reported that Tropical Low 12U had developed within the Gulf of Carpentaria. Gradual strengthening took place and on 25 January, the Joint Typhoon Warning Center (JTWC) began monitoring the system as Tropical Cyclone 10P. A few hours later, TCWC Perth upgraded the low into a Category 1 Tropical Cyclone, naming it Bianca. Early on the next day, TCWC Perth further upgraded Bianca to a Category 2 Tropical Cyclone. Intensification continued and late on the same day, TCWC Perth upgraded Bianca into a Category 3 Severe Tropical Cyclone. The system continued to intensify and became a Category 4 severe tropical cyclone on 28 January. On the same day, the system started weakening rapidly and TCWC Perth downgraded Bianca into a Category 3 Severe Tropical Cyclone.

Rain and strong winds were experienced along the Kimberley coast on 25 January. On 26 January, Bianca moved away from Kimberley and weather conditions started to improve. Bianca disrupted operations in Australia's major iron ore port and several oil facilities. In Western Australia, preparations were underway as the system was soon expected to approach land. As soon as Bianca became a category 3 Severe tropical cyclone, strong winds lashed through Pilbara suspending oil and gas production and port facilities. Though Bianca was moving away and the level of risk was going down, coastal communities between Onslow and Exmouth remained on a red alert as the system intensified. On 28 January, according to the media, there was a chance for Bianca to start weakening, as it was moving further south into a colder, high pressure zone.

The last cyclone to track south of Perth was Cyclone Ned in 1989.

Severe Tropical Cyclone Bianca was expected to make landfall around Mandurah as a weak Category 1 or strong Tropical Low late on 30 January. A Cyclone Warning was issued for the area between just north of Jurien Bay and Albany, including Perth. However, the warnings were cancelled on 30 January as Bianca dissipated south of Western Australia in the afternoon of 30 January. The airmass around Bianca was responsible for giving Perth and the Southwest of WA a taste of the tropics with severe thunderstorms, unrelated to Bianca, springing up on 29 January causing damage in the Geraldton region. Two deaths were attributed to damaging severe thunderstorms that formed along the storm's outer rainbands.

Severe Tropical Cyclone Yasi 

Yasi entered the Australian region from the South Pacific basin on 31 January. By the time Yasi crossed into the basin, preparations for the storm were under way. Media outlets referred to the storm as "what could be the state's worst cyclone in history." Many feared that the tropical cyclone could cause damage more severe than Cyclone Larry in 2006 and Cyclone Tracy, which nearly destroyed Darwin, in 1974. Thousands of residents in the path of the storm were urged to evacuate by Premier Anna Bligh.

Yasi crossed the Queensland coast near Mission Beach shortly after midnight (local time) on 3 February. At that time, the large destructive core around the eye extended between Innisfail and Cardwell, Queensland. Yasi caused at least $3.6 billion (2011 USD) in damage, becoming the costliest tropical cyclone recorded in the Australian region. Accounting for inflation, Yasi was the second-costliest tropical cyclone in Australia's history, after Cyclone Tracy. One death occurred due to asphyxiation in Ingham.

Tropical Low 15U 

A low formed off the Western Australian coast on 8 February and drifted steadily west south west for the next few days. On 11 February, the Bureau of Meteorology identified the system as Tropical Low 15U and began monitoring the system for further development. Later that day, the JTWC began issuing advisories on the system under the name 14S. The storm was expected to reach minimal category 1 cyclone intensity (Australian scale) on 12 February but high shear, cool sea temperatures and poor organisation saw the system stay as a low.

Severe Tropical Cyclone Dianne 

Over the next few days, the system remained well offshore and was steered drifted towards the west-southwest by a ridge of high pressure while slowly developing further.

A Cyclone watch was issued for the coastal communities between Onslow to Coral Bay. Late on 16 February, the low formed into Tropical Cyclone Dianne whilst 445 km NW of Exmouth. Dianne intensified as expected and was upgraded to a Category 2 cyclone on 18 February whilst slowly moving towards the SSW. On 19 February the system intensified into a Category 3 severe tropical cyclone.
By late 21 February the system lost its strength as it moved into colder waters and was downgraded to a Category 1 Tropical Cyclone, and by 22 February it was classified as an ex-Tropical low.

Severe Tropical Cyclone Carlos 

A severe weather warning was issued for northwest Darwin-Daly District and the Tiwi Islands. Heavy rain pounded the area on 15 February with reports of Marrara recording  and Darwin International Airport  of rain.

On 16 February the slow moving system strengthened into Tropical Cyclone Carlos causing localised flooding and damage to homes, with fallen trees. Schools in Darwin, Darwin International Airport and East Arm Wharf were closed. After looping around the Darwin area overnight and back over land the system weakened on 17 February and BOM downgraded it to a Tropical low. A record three-day total of  rain was recorded at Darwin International Airport due to the lingering of the system.

The system moved slowly southwest on 18 February moving towards the Northern Territory/Western Australian border with a possibility of restrengthening. The community of Daly River received  of rainfall. On 19 February the system passed into the Northern Kimberley region. Rainfall totals were not as large as in previous days. Wyndham recorded  while Kalumburu recorded  of rainfall.

In the early hours of 21 February the system returned to the open waters of the Indian Ocean, causing it to redevelop back into a cyclone. The cyclone continued to track southwest at a relatively fast pace and produced a squall line that generated four tornadoes in the mining town of Karratha which damaged 38 homes as well as numerous cars, buildings and a school. It also strengthened steadily to become a category 2 cyclone.

On 22 February the system moved parallel to the Pilbara coast. The strongest gusts of  recorded at Varanus Island.

As Carlos moved away from the western coast of Australia on 24 February it strengthened into a Severe Tropical Cyclone. Carlos also spun-off a mini tornado to Ellenbrook, Perth, Western Australia on 28 February.

Tropical Low 18U 

In the early hours of 28 February the tropical low moved inland from King Sound. Heavy rainfall was reported on the Dampier Peninsula east and southeast of Port Hedland, including Telfer and parts of the De Grey catchment. Derby recorded  of rain while Camballin received  and the aboriginal community of Looma had . The tropical low continued moving overland and the BOM issued their final advisory on 28 February.

Tropical Low 23U (Cherono) 

Over the next couple of days the low remained slow moving. On 13 March, the low briefly moved into TCWC Perth's area of responsibility, before crossing 90°E and moving out of the Australian region and into the South-West Indian Ocean. It later developed into Tropical Storm Cherono.

Tropical Cyclone 25U 

Towards the end of March, a tropical low developed within the monsoon trough, in the western Arafura Sea to the north of the Tiwi Islands. Over the next few days, the system moved south-westwards and passed over the Tiwi Islands during 31 March. Over the next few days the system slowly moved around the Arafura Sea, before TCWC Darwin initiated advisories on the low during 30 March as atmospheric convection surrounding the system organised further.

During February 2022, a reanalysis of the system showed that it had developed into a tropical cyclone during 2 April, before it made landfall on the northern Kimberley coast.

Severe Tropical Cyclone Errol 

During 12 April the Australian Bureau of Meteorology reported that Tropical Low 29U, had developed over the Timor Sea to the south of Timor-Leste. Over the next couple of days the system moved southwards towards the Australian state of Kimberly and intensified gradually before it was declared a category 1 tropical cyclone and named Errol by the BoM early on 15 April.

Other systems 
During 15 December, Tropical Low 04U was located to the northeast of Nhulunbuy, though TCWC Darwin did not mention their low in their next bulletin. On 30 December, TCWC Perth started issuing advisories on Tropical Low 06U that had developed inland over the Top End of Western Australia. On 1 January, when 06U had emerged over the Indian Ocean waters, it was forecast that it would intensify into a tropical cyclone, though shear had caused the low to struggle to develop. TCWC Perth issued its final advisory the next day as 06U weakened to a low-pressure area. On 31 January, Tropical Low 13U developed well over in the Indian Ocean. Tropical Low 19U developed over in the southern Gulf of Carpentaria on 26 February, monitored by TCWC Darwin. 19U was last noted on 1 March as it was close the Northern Territory and Queensland border with a pressure of 1000 hPa.

During that day, the low tracked eastwards, and gradually intensified. On 8 March it continued eastwards. Later that day, the low moved out of the Australian region, entered the South Pacific and was assigned the new designation 12F. Tropical Low 22U briefly developed during 11 March over Kimberley associated within the monsoon trough. Tropical Low 26U, located north of Pilbara coast and Tropical Low 27U, over in the 90° east median, developed on 30 March. Both lows did not intensify further and dissipated while last mentioned in the bulletins of TCWC Perth during 3 April, though 27U moved into the South-West Indian Ocean basin and the MFR gave the designation of 08R. On 14 April, Tropical Low 28U developed to the northwest of New Caledonia until it crossed the basin into the South Pacific the next day.

Season effects 

|-
| Anggrek ||  || bgcolor=#| || bgcolor=#| || bgcolor=#| || Cocos (Keeling) Islands || None || None ||
|-
| Abele ||  || bgcolor=#| || bgcolor=#| || bgcolor=#| || None ||  ||  ||
|-
| 03U ||  || bgcolor=#| || bgcolor=#| || bgcolor=#| || Western Australia || $ || None ||
|-
| 04U ||  || bgcolor=#| || bgcolor=#| || bgcolor=#| || None || None || None ||
|-
| Tasha ||  || bgcolor=#| || bgcolor=#| || bgcolor=#| || Queensland || Unknown || 1 ||
|-
| 06U ||  || bgcolor=#| || bgcolor=#| || bgcolor=#| || Northern Territory, Western Australia || None || None ||
|-
| 07U ||  || bgcolor=#| || bgcolor=#| || bgcolor=#| || None || None || None ||
|-
| 08U ||  || bgcolor=#| || bgcolor=#| || bgcolor=#| || None || None || None ||
|-
| Vince ||  || bgcolor=#| || bgcolor=#| || bgcolor=#| || None || None || None ||
|-
| Zelia ||  || bgcolor=#| || bgcolor=#| || bgcolor=#| || None || None || None ||
|-
| Anthony ||  || bgcolor=#| || bgcolor=#| ||bgcolor=#| || Queensland || Minor || None ||
|-
| Bianca ||  || bgcolor=#| || bgcolor=#| || bgcolor=#| || Northern Territory, Western Australia || Unknown || 2 ||
|-
| 13U ||  || bgcolor=#| || bgcolor=#| || bgcolor=#| || None || None || None ||
|-
| Yasi ||  || bgcolor=#| || bgcolor=#| || bgcolor=#| || Solomon Islands, Australia || $ || 1 ||
|-
| 15U ||  || bgcolor=#| || bgcolor=#| || bgcolor=#| || None || None || None ||
|-
| Dianne ||  || bgcolor=#| || bgcolor=#| || bgcolor=#| || Western Australia || Minimal || None ||
|-
| Carlos  ||  || bgcolor=#| || bgcolor=#| || bgcolor=#| || Northern Territory, Western Australia ||  || None ||
|-
| 18U ||  || bgcolor=#| || bgcolor=#| || bgcolor=#| || None || None || None ||
|-
| 19U ||  || bgcolor=#| || bgcolor=#| || bgcolor=#|  || Northern Territory  || None || None ||
|-
| 20U ||  || bgcolor=#| || bgcolor=#| || bgcolor=#| || None || None || None || 
|-
| 21U ||  || bgcolor=#| || bgcolor=#| || bgcolor=#| || None || None || None ||
|-
| 22U ||  || bgcolor=#| || bgcolor=#| || bgcolor=#| || None || None || None ||
|-
| 23U ||  || bgcolor=#| || bgcolor=#| || bgcolor=#| || None || None || None ||
|-
| 25U ||  || bgcolor=#| || bgcolor=#| || bgcolor=#| || Western Australia || None || None ||
|-
| 26U ||  || bgcolor=#| || bgcolor=#| || bgcolor=#| || None || None || None ||
|-
| 27U ||  || bgcolor=#| || bgcolor=#| || bgcolor=#| || None || None || None ||
|-
| 28U ||  || bgcolor=#| || bgcolor=#| || bgcolor=#| || None || None  || None ||
|-
| Errol ||  || bgcolor=#| || bgcolor=#| || bgcolor=#| || West Timor || None || None ||
|-

See also 

 Tropical cyclones in 2010 and 2011
 Australian region tropical cyclone
 List of Southern Hemisphere tropical cyclone seasons
 Atlantic hurricane seasons: 2010, 2011
 Pacific hurricane seasons: 2010, 2011
 Pacific typhoon seasons: 2010, 2011
 North Indian Ocean cyclone seasons: 2010, 2011
 2010–11 South-West Indian Ocean cyclone season
 2010–11 South Pacific cyclone season
 South Atlantic tropical cyclone

Notes

References

External links 
 World Meteorological Organization
 Bureau of Meteorology (TCWC's Perth, Darwin & Brisbane)
 Tropical Cyclone Warning Center Jakarta
 Joint Typhoon Warning Center (JTWC) 

Australian region cyclone seasons
Articles which contain graphical timelines
2010 Aus
2011 Aus